Lluis Nicolau d'Olwer (20 January 1888 - 24 December 1961) was a Catalan politician and writer who held office in the provisional government of the Second Spanish Republic, heading the Economics Ministry from April 1931.

Biography
The son of the notary Josep Nicolau and Anna d'Olwer (who was of Irish ancestry), he was born in Barcelona where he studied philosophy and literature before completing a doctorate in Madrid. In 1917, he published Literatura catalana, the first account of Catalan literature written in the Catalan language. In 1918, he became a member of the philology department of the Institute of Catalan Studies and a representative of the Regionalist League under the Municipality of Barcelona.

As a member of the Cultural Committee, he initiated modern teaching policies and in 1922 was a co-founder of the Acció Catalana. From 1926 to 1931, he was persecuted by the Dictatorship of Primo de Rivera. In 1933, he was deputy chairman of the London Economic Conference and governor of the Bank of Spain. During the Spanish Civil War, he was exiled to France. When the Germans occupied France during the Second World War, he was arrested by the Gestapo but managed to escape. He went to Mexico where he served as Minister without Portfolio for the Republican Government in Exile. After the war, he continued to live in Mexico where he was appointed a member of the College of Mexico. He contributed to historical works until his death in Mexico City on 24 December 1961.

References

1888 births
1961 deaths
People from Barcelona
Regionalist League of Catalonia politicians
Acció Catalana politicians
Government ministers during the Second Spanish Republic
Governors of the Bank of Spain
Members of the Congress of Deputies of the Second Spanish Republic
Spanish people of the Spanish Civil War (Republican faction)
Exiles of the Spanish Civil War in Mexico
Exiled Spanish politicians